Darkhan Argynovich Bayakhmetov (Darhan Arğynūly Baiahmetov; born August 21, 1985 in Oskemen, Shyrgys Qazaqstan) is an amateur Kazakh Greco-Roman wrestler, who played for the men's welterweight category. He won a gold medal for his division at the 2009 Asian Wrestling Championships in Pattaya, Thailand, and silver at the 2010 Asian Games in Guangzhou, China.

Bayakhmetov made his official debut for the 2008 Summer Olympics in Beijing, where he competed in the men's 66 kg class. He defeated Germany's Markus Thätner, and China's Li Yanyan in the preliminary rounds, before losing out the semi-final match to France's Steeve Guénot, who was able to score four points in two straight periods, leaving Bayakhmetov with a single point. Because his opponent advanced further into the final match, Bayakhmetov automatically qualified for the bronze medal bout, where he was defeated by Belarus' Mikhail Siamionau, with a three-set technical score (2–0, 1–1, 1–1), and a classification point score of 1–3.

At the 2012 Summer Olympics in London, Bayakhmetov lost the preliminary round of sixteen match of the men's 66 kg class to Lithuania's Edgaras Venckaitis, with a technical score of 2–6.

References

External links
Profile – International Wrestling Database
NBC Olympics Profile

1985 births
Living people
Olympic wrestlers of Kazakhstan
Wrestlers at the 2008 Summer Olympics
Wrestlers at the 2012 Summer Olympics
Sportspeople from Oskemen
Asian Games medalists in wrestling
Wrestlers at the 2010 Asian Games
Kazakhstani male sport wrestlers
Asian Games silver medalists for Kazakhstan
Medalists at the 2010 Asian Games
21st-century Kazakhstani people